Jonathan Griffin (1906–1990) was a British writer and translator. During the Second World War he served as the director of BBC European Intelligence.

Works
 Glass Houses and Modern War (London: Chatto and Windus, 1938)
 In Earthlight: Selected Poems (London: Menard Press, 1995)

Translations
 Nikos Kazantzakis, The Greek Passion (New York: Simon & Schuster, 1953)
 Another edition as Christ Recrucified (Oxford: Bruno Cassirer, 1954)
 Charles de Gaulle, War Memoirs, vol. 1 (London: Collins, 1955)
 Nikos Kazantzakis, Freedom and Death (Oxford: Bruno Cassirer, 1956)
 Pierre Courthion, Flemish Painting (London: Thames and Hudson, 1958)
 Jean Rostand, Can Man be modified? (London: Secker & Warburg, 1959)
 Henri Queffélec, Frontier of the Unknown (London: Secker & Warburg, 1960)
 Germain Bazin, Baroque & Rococo (London: Thames & Hudson, 1964)
 Suzanne Lilar, Aspects of Love in Western Society (London: Thames & Hudson [1965])
 André Adrien Chastel, The Studios and Styles of the Renaissance: Italy, 1460-1500 (London: Thames & Hudson, 1966)
 Fernando Pessoa, Selected Poems (Oxford: Carcanet Press, 1971)
 Jean-Louis Barrault, Memories for Tomorrow (London: Thames and Hudson, 1974)
 Heinrich Von Kleist, The Prince of Homburg for the Royal Exchange, Manchester in 1976. 
 Robert Bresson, Notes on Cinematography (New York; London: Urizen Books; Distributed by Pluto Press, 1977)

References

1906 births
1990 deaths